The name Lingling has been used to name four tropical cyclones in the Western Pacific Ocean. It was part of a series of reduplicated female names proposed by Hong Kong.

 Typhoon Lingling (2001) (T0123, 27W, Nanang) – struck the Philippines, where it caused extensive damage, and China.
 Tropical Storm Lingling (2007) (T0718, 18W) – churned in the open ocean.
 Tropical Storm Lingling (2014) (T1401, 01W, Agaton) – caused widespread flooding and landslides in Mindanao.
 Typhoon Lingling (2019) (T1913, 15W, Liwayway) – a powerful Category 4 storm that passed through the Ryukyu Islands and struck North Korea as a Category 1 typhoon.

Pacific typhoon set index articles